6 Years, 6 Feet Under the Influence is the first compilation album by horror themed punk band Frankenstein Drag Queens from Planet 13. It was released on November 30, 2004 on People Like You records. All songs featured are re-recorded and tweaked from their original versions, with Wednesday 13 himself playing all instruments. This compilation also includes five new tracks and four specially recorded interludes.

Track listing

Album credits

Frankenstein Drag Queens from Planet 13
Wednesday 13: Vocals, Guitar, Bass, Keyboards, Song Introductions Performer, Music, Lyrics
Scabs: Drums
Jamie Hoover: Piano on "Your Mother Sucks Cocks In Hell"

Production
Produced by Wednesday 13
Co-produced and engineered by Jamie Hoover

References

Frankenstein Drag Queens from Planet 13 albums
2004 compilation albums